Arkadź Kulašoǔ, russified form Arkadi Kuleshov (February 6, 1914 – February 4, 1978) was a Soviet and Belarusian poet, translator and screenwriter. He was best known for his poems, Brigade Flag and Cymbalon, as well as his translations of poetry into Belarusian.

References

1914 births
1978 deaths
20th-century Belarusian poets
20th-century Belarusian writers
20th-century male writers
20th-century screenwriters
20th-century translators
People from Cherikovsky Uyezd
People from Kastsyukovichy District
Communist Party of the Soviet Union members
Members of the Supreme Soviet of the Byelorussian SSR (1947–1950)
Members of the Supreme Soviet of the Byelorussian SSR (1951–1954)
Members of the Supreme Soviet of the Byelorussian SSR (1955–1959)
Members of the Supreme Soviet of the Byelorussian SSR (1959–1962)
Members of the Supreme Soviet of the Byelorussian SSR (1962–1966)
Members of the Supreme Soviet of the Byelorussian SSR (1967–1970)
Members of the Supreme Soviet of the Byelorussian SSR (1971–1974)
Members of the Supreme Soviet of the Byelorussian SSR (1975–1979)
Socialist realism writers
Stalin Prize winners
Recipients of the Byelorussian SSR State Prize
Recipients of the Order of Lenin
Recipients of the Order of the Red Banner
Recipients of the Order of the Red Banner of Labour
Belarusian male poets

Belarusian screenwriters
Belarusian translators
Soviet male poets
Soviet screenwriters
Soviet translators